The 2008–09 Virginia Cavaliers men's basketball team represented the University of Virginia during the 2008–09 NCAA Division I men's basketball season. The team was led by fourth-year head coach Dave Leitao, and played their home games at John Paul Jones Arena in Charlottesville, Virginia as members of the Atlantic Coast Conference.

The Cavaliers were picked to finish last in the conference this season in the pre-season media poll. While they only finished 11th, ahead of Georgia Tech, their record of 10–18 and 4–12 in conference was the worst the team had received in over forty years. At the end of the season, head coach Dave Leitao resigned. On April 1, 2009, Washington State head coach Tony Bennett was announced as his replacement.

Last season
The Cavaliers had a record of 17–16, with a conference record of 5–11.

Roster

Schedule 

|-
!colspan=9 style="background:#00214e; color:#f56d22;"| Exhibition game

|-
!colspan=9 style="background:#00214e; color:#f56d22;"| Regular season

|-
!colspan=9 style="background:#00214e; color:#f56d22;"| ACC Tournament

References

Virginia
Virginia Cavaliers men's basketball seasons
2008 in sports in Virginia
2009 in sports in Virginia